Thuthiyoor is a region near Kakkanad in the city of Kochi in Kerala, India.

Thuthiyoor shares its boundaries with Chittethukara, Eroor, Kakkanad and Palachuvadu. The rear wall of Cochin Special Economic Zone forms the north-eastern boundary. It has a history  of about 100 years, mainly associated with the local mosque Palachuvadu Juma Masjid and Sreekrishnaswamy Temple  (only one Sreekrishna temple in Thrikkakara Panchayathu). There are other six temples in this village. Two Christian churches, three schools and two convents are situated in this village. Most of the people are god fearing and harmonious. St. Charles school, St. Mary's school and Bhavans Adarsha Vidyalaya are the main schools in this area. The infamous 300 feet deep "Paaramada" is a must watch. There is a tradition of young Malayali boys (also called 'Freakens' or 'Frrreakenz') who play a peculiar style of cricket every evening, barring the days when it rains during game time (between 4 to 6.30 pm).

References 

Special economic zones
Villages in Ernakulam district